The 2015 Rally Poland was the seventh round of the 2015 World Rally Championship season, held over 2–5 July 2015 and was based at Mikołajki, Poland. Sébastien Ogier won the rally, his fifth victory of the 2015 WRC season.

Entry list

Overall standings

Special stages

Power Stage

References

Poland
Rally of Poland
Rally